Hans Nordvik (1 August 1880 – 22 July 1960) was a Norwegian rifle shooter who competed in the early 20th century in rifle shooting. He participated in shooting at the 1920 Summer Olympics in Antwerp and won the gold medals both in team 100 m running deer, single shots and team 100 m running deer, double shots.

References

1880 births
1960 deaths
ISSF rifle shooters
Norwegian male sport shooters
Olympic gold medalists for Norway
Olympic shooters of Norway
Shooters at the 1912 Summer Olympics
Shooters at the 1920 Summer Olympics
Olympic medalists in shooting
Medalists at the 1920 Summer Olympics
People from Troms
Sportspeople from Troms og Finnmark
20th-century Norwegian people